The Mangatāwhiri River is a river of the Waikato region of New Zealand's North Island. It flows generally southwest from its sources in the Hunua Ranges southeast of Clevedon before flowing through a system of irrigation canals at the northern edge of the Waikato Plains close to the town of Pōkeno. It reaches the Waikato River close to the township of Mercer.

The New Zealand Ministry for Culture and Heritage gives a translation of "Tāwhiri tree stream" for Mangatāwhiri.

The upper reaches of the Mangatāwhiri are dammed to form reservoirs to store water for use by Auckland City.

History
Under the orders of Governor George Grey, it was here that on 12 July 1863 British troops marched over and declared war on the Māori, starting the Waikato Land Wars.

See also
List of rivers of New Zealand

References

External links

River flow at SH2 Bridge
Water quality at Buckingham Bridge
Photographs of Mangatawhiri River held in Auckland Libraries' heritage collections.
Te Araroa long distance walkway, which is on the river stopbank for 5km

Rivers of Waikato
Waikato District
Rivers of New Zealand
Tributaries of the Waikato River